Daniel James Osborne (born 27 June 1991) is an English television personality, known for being a former cast member on the ITVBe reality series The Only Way Is Essex. In 2018, he was a housemate on Celebrity Big Brother, reaching the final and finishing in third place.

Personal life
Osborne is married to actress Jacqueline Jossa, with whom he has two daughters. He also has a son from an earlier relationship.

Filmography

Television

Guest appearances
 Big Brother's Bit on the Side (September 2018) - 1 Episode
 Most Shocking Celebrity Moments 2018 (December 2018) - TV Documentary

References

External links

1991 births
Living people
English television personalities
Television personalities from Essex
People from Dagenham